The City Council of Valladolid (Spanish: Ayuntamiento de Valladolid) is the top-tier administrative and governing body (ayuntamiento) of the municipality of Valladolid, Spain.

Organization 
Its organization regime is based on the Law 7/1985, of April 2, regulatory of the Bases of the Local Regime. Integrated by the Mayor and the councillors, the ayuntamiento is charged with the government and administration of the municipality. The Mayor, who holds the highest representation of the city, directs politics government and administration and presides over the whole corporation as well as the plenary. The later is conformed by all the council members and it is tasked with adopting strategic decisions, overseeing the executive bodies and passing by-laws and regulations.

Mayor
The Mayor is elected by the members of the plenary among its members the day the new municipal corporation is formed after the local election, and has a mandate for the 4-year duration of the elected body. Since 13 June 2015 the Mayor is Óscar Puente.

City hall 

The city hall is located at the Plaza Mayor, 1, in the city centre. Its construction started in 1892. The building, a work of Repullés y Vargas, was inaugurated on 19 September 1908, although by that time the construction was not yet finished.

See also 
 Local government in Spain

References 

Valladolid
Valladolid
Politics of Castile and León